Robert Vunderink (born 28 August 1961) is a retired speed skater from the Netherlands who was active between 1981 and 1993. He competed at the 1984 and 1992 Winter Olympics in the 5000 m and 10000 m; his best achievement was fourth place in the 10000 m in 1992. 

He finished in second place at the national allround championships in 1983 and then focused on long distances, winning the 10000 m in 1987 and 1989, finishing second in 1991 and 1992, and third in 1990. He was less successful in 5000 m, with a silver medal at the national championship in 1989 and two bronze medals in 1991 and 1992.

Personal bests: 
500 m – 40.03 (1985)
1000 m – 1:18.60 (1985)
 1500 m – 1:59.23 (1982)
 5000 m – 6:51.43 (1992)
 10000 m – 14:02.34 (1992)

References

1961 births
Living people
Olympic speed skaters of the Netherlands
Dutch male speed skaters
Speed skaters at the 1984 Winter Olympics
Speed skaters at the 1992 Winter Olympics
Sportspeople from Zwolle